Quicksburg is a CDP in Shenandoah County, in the U.S. state of Virginia.

The Benjamin Wierman House and Zirkle Mill are listed on the National Register of Historic Places.

References

Census-designated places in Shenandoah County, Virginia
Census-designated places in Virginia